Texas State Highway 350 (SH 350) begins in Big Spring and runs in a mostly northeastward direction to Snyder.

Route description
Beginning at a junction with Business Loop I-20 at Big Spring in Howard County, SH 350 intersects Interstate 20 on the northern edge of the town. The highway is known as Owen Street in Big Spring. SH 350 then runs northeast past Howard County municipal airport to its final junction with US 180 at Snyder in Scurry County, where it is known as College Avenue. The route traverses Howard, Mitchell and Scurry Counties. Except for the portions in Big Spring and Snyder, most of the terrain covered by the highway is lightly populated agricultural and oil country. The route has remained essentially unchanged since its original designation on August 23, 1943.

Major intersections

References

External links
Texas official travel map at the Texas Department of Transportation (Adobe Acrobat format, magnification required for legibility)
Satellite image of junction of SH 350 with Interstate 20 in Big Spring at Google Maps

339
Transportation in Howard County, Texas
Transportation in Mitchell County, Texas
Transportation in Scurry County, Texas